Carl Axel Jansson (24 April 1882 – 22 September 1909) was a Swedish sport shooter who competed in the 1908 Summer Olympics. In 1908 he won the silver medal in the team free rifle event. In the team military rifle event he finished fifth and in the 300 metre free rifle competition he finished seventh.

References

External links
profile

1882 births
1909 deaths
Swedish male sport shooters
ISSF rifle shooters
Olympic shooters of Sweden
Shooters at the 1908 Summer Olympics
Olympic silver medalists for Sweden
Olympic medalists in shooting
Sport shooters from Stockholm
Medalists at the 1908 Summer Olympics
19th-century Swedish people
20th-century Swedish people